Parliamentary elections were held in Greece on 26 March 1906. Supporters of Georgios Theotokis emerged as the largest bloc in Parliament, with between 112 and 114 of the 177 seats. Theotokis remained Prime Minister after the election, having  originally assumed office on 21 December 1905.

Results

References

Greece
Parliamentary elections in Greece
1906 in Greece
1900s in Greek politics
Greece
Legis